Ray Pitt was a British film editor who spent much of his career at Ealing Studios working on films such as the George Formby comedy vehicles Come On George! (1939) and Spare a Copper (1940) as well as on more serious productions such as the Second World War film Convoy (1940). He later worked at Hammer Films.

Selected filmography
 Calling the Tune (1936)
 Dreams Come True (1936)
 Secret Lives (1937)
 The Girl in the Taxi (1937)
 Brief Ecstasy (1937)
 I've Got a Horse (1938)
 What a Man! (1938)
 Let's Be Famous (1939)
 There Ain't No Justice (1939)
 Cheer Boys Cheer (1939)
 Come On George! (1939)
 Saloon Bar (1940)
 The Proud Valley (1940)
 The Goose Steps Out (1942)
 A Gunman Has Escaped (1948)
 Man in Black (1949)
 Meet Simon Cherry (1949)

References

Bibliography
 Barr, Charles. Ealing Studios. University of California Press, 1998.

External links

Year of birth unknown
Year of death unknown
British film editors